Rawlins Academy is a secondary school of about 1600 students situated in Quorn, Leicestershire, England.

History

Origin
Thomas Rawlins founded the school in 1691.

Grammar school
Rawlins became the Thomas Rawlins Grammar School, also known as Rawlins Grammar School.

Comprehensive
Leicestershire changed to comprehensive schools in the 1960s and 1970s, with its Leicestershire plan, implementing three-tier education with upper schools from the age of 14. The school was known as Rawlins School and Community College from 1967, before being renamed the Rawlins Upper School and Community College in the late 1970s.

In September 2013, Rawlins admitted over 240 year seven students as it moved from 14-19 provision to 11-19.

Academy
On 1 November 2011, Rawlins Community College officially gained academy status and became independent of local authority control. In September 2013 the name of the school became Rawlins Academy.

Traditions

Houses
At the beginning of the 2006 autumn term, Rawlins was divided into six houses: Bradgate (Purple), Beaumanor (Red), Swithland (Blue), Outwoods (Green), Beacon (Orange), and Buddon (Yellow).

In the 2009 Autumn term there were a vertical tutor groups with students from all years being placed in the same forms. Each form is assigned a house, with about 20 forms from each house.
In 2017, Rawlins changed their coaching system to year tutor groups. At this point each year group had 12 forms (2 for each house).

A revamped house system has launched in 2020, with the school reducing to four houses: Ignis (Red), Terra (Green), Aqua (Blue) and Spiritus (Yellow). This meant that there are now 8 tutor groups for each year (2 in each house). The house names are the Latin translations of the words Fire, Earth, Water and Air. These names were chosen by a vote taken part in by the whole school, and the choice of Latin being used was decided upon by the Year 7 group of 2020-2021.

Media enterprises

Raw TV 
Raw TV broadcasts programs from news to event coverage and general entertainment programming via the Rawlins VLE. The current regular programme is the Raw TV News. Other shows currently air as one-off specials and cover anything from sporting events to Rawlins film makers. Raw TV was featured on BBC East Midlands Today in December 2008 as it is one of the only student run college TV networks in the country. The students that run Raw TV work in partnership with other local schools. Programs are edited by students using Apple Final Cut Pro.

Notable former pupils 
 Tom Bayliss, footballer for Preston North End; (formerly of Coventry City - League Two Play-off final winner 2017/18)
 Dorothy Bennett (biologist), Professor of Cell Biology, since 1999, at the Molecular and Clinical Sciences Research Institute at St George's, University of London
 Louise Lear, BBC weather presenter, from Rothley (only her A-levels), and her husband Ian
 Billy Kee, footballer for Leicester City and Accrington Stanley
 George Martin, rugby player for Leicester Tigers; Premiership Rugby winner 2021/22
 Liam Moore, footballer for Reading FC and Leicester City; Championship winner 2013/14 with Leicester City 
 Matt Piper, footballer for Leicester City; scored the last goal at Filbert Street stadium
 Willie Thorne, snooker player and BBC TV commentator
 Jenny Tomlinson, Archdeacon of Birmingham since 2019
 George Martin, rugby football player for Leicester Tigers and England

References

External links 
 Rawlins Academy website
 EduBase

News items
 Smoking in June 2009

Borough of Charnwood
Academies in Leicestershire
Educational institutions established in 1967
Church of England secondary schools in the Diocese of Leicester
Secondary schools in Leicestershire
1967 establishments in England